Illinois Route 102 (IL 102) is a state route in northeast Illinois. It runs from IL 53 in Wilmington to the concurrency of U.S. Route 45 (US 45) and US 52 in Bourbonnais, just north of Kankakee.

Route description 
IL 102 runs parallel to and north of the Kankakee River for its entire length. For , IL 102 is located next to the Kankakee River State Park. Entrances to the park's two major campgrounds are located off Illinois 102.

IL 113 takes a mostly parallel route, but on the south side of the river.

The road is two lanes for its entire length, except for a four-lane stretch with center turn lanes measuring approximately  near its eastern end in Bourbonnais.  A center turn lane also exists within a two-lane section for a few blocks inside the city of Wilmington.

History

IL 102 and IL 113 were both established in 1924, and originally both routes were numbered as IL 113. In 1935, IL 113 north of the river became IL 113N, and the south branch became IL 113S. From 1936 to 1940, US 52 was formed to run along IL 113S, renumbering IL 113N to IL 113. In 1940, US 52 was rerouted to go through downtown Joliet, reverting to the IL 113N and IL 113S layout. In 1961, Illinois 113N was renumbered as IL 102, and IL 113S became IL 113 again.

Major intersections

See also

References

External links

102
Transportation in Will County, Illinois
Transportation in Kankakee County, Illinois